Show Folks is a 1928 American silent drama film directed by Paul L. Stein and starring Eddie Quillan, Lina Basquette, and Carole Lombard.

Cast

Preservation
This film survives at the French archive Centre national du cinéma et de l'image animée in Fort de Bois-d'Arcy, Library of Congress, and UCLA Film and Television Archive.

References

Bibliography
 Wes D. Gehring. Carole Lombard, the Hoosier Tornado. Indiana Historical Society Press, 2003.

External links

1928 films
Films directed by Paul L. Stein
American silent feature films
American black-and-white films
Pathé Exchange films
1920s English-language films
1920s American films
Silent American comedy-drama films